Aldatmak is a Turkish drama series that was aired on TV on September 22, 2022. The drama in which Vahide Percin, Ercan Kesal and Mustafa Ugurlu starred is directed by Murat Saracoglu and screenwritten by Yildiz Tunc.

Plot 
She is a distinguished, respected family court judge. She is an honest and principled woman who has saved many marriages from destruction, made sure that many children receive the affection and love they deserve, and has always been on the side of justice. She thinks that they are an exemplary family with her husband and two children, that they live an honorable life, and that the rest of their marriage will pass in usual love, happiness and peace. One day, Güzide accidentally pulls a noose and she starts to realize that her happy family is not a warm home, but a sand castle.

Cast 

 Vahide Percin – Guzide Yenersoy
 Ercan Kesal – Ali Sezai Okumus
 Mustafa Ugurlu – Tarik Yenersoy
 Yusuf Cim – Ozan Yenersoy
 Cem Bender – Oltan Kasifoglu
 Caner Sahin – Tolga Kasifoglu
 Feyza Sevil Gungor – Oylum Yenersoy 
 Asena Girisken – Yesim Denizeren 
 Cem Surgit – Umit Ozguder
 Meltem Baytok – Nazan Tokluca

General view

Episodes

References 

Turkish drama television series
Current Turkish television series